Minnesota State Highway 313 (MN 313) is a highway in northwest Minnesota, which runs from its intersection with State Highway 11 in Warroad and continues north to its northern terminus at the Canada–US border; where the route becomes Manitoba Highway 12 upon crossing the border, near the communities of Middlebro and Sprague, Manitoba.

Route description
Highway 313 serves as a short north–south route in northwest Minnesota between the city of Warroad and the Canada–US border.

The roadway is part of the promoted route MOM's Way, a tourist route from Thunder Bay to Winnipeg.

Highway 313 generally follows not far from the southwest corner of the Lake of the Woods throughout its route.

The route is legally defined as Route 313 in the Minnesota Statutes.

History
Highway 313 was authorized on April 24, 1959.

The route was paved in 1962.

Major intersections

References

External links

Highway 313 at the Unofficial Minnesota Highways Page
MOM's Way

313
Transportation in Roseau County, Minnesota